The Asunción Paraguay Temple is the 112th operating temple of the Church of Jesus Christ of Latter-day Saints (LDS Church).

Although there were already eleven other dedicated temples in South America, the Asunción Temple was the first temple to be built in Paraguay. The Asunción Temple will serve more than 68,000 members in the area.

History
In 1949 Paraguay was officially opened to Mormon missionaries under the mission headquartered in Uruguay. In 1977 Paraguay became its own mission area and soon after converts to the LDS Church began to increase. The average number of baptisms per year in Paraguay up to that time had been just over 200. In the year following the announcement 400 people were baptized into the church.  On April 2, 2000 an announcement was made that the LDS Church was planning to build a temple in Paraguay. At the time the temple was announced, there were approximately 152,000 church members in Paraguay.

On February 3, 2001 the site for the Asunción Paraguay Temple was dedicated and a groundbreaking ceremony was held. Despite it being a rainy, cloudy day, many members came to be a part of the building of the temple. An open house was held from May 4–11, 2002. This allowed both church members and those not of the faith to see the inside of the temple and learn more about what takes place inside. On Sunday May 19, 2002 four dedicatory sessions were held, with LDS Church president Gordon B. Hinckley offering the dedicatory prayer.

On April 10, 2017 the LDS Church announced that the temple would close in November 2017 for renovations that were anticipated to be completed in 2019. Following completion of the renovations in 2019, a public open house was held from October 12 through 19 (except for Sunday, the 13th). The temple was rededicated on November 3, 2019, by D. Todd Christofferson.

In 2020, the Asunción Paraguay Temple was closed temporarily during the year in response to the coronavirus pandemic.

See also

 Comparison of temples of The Church of Jesus Christ of Latter-day Saints
 List of temples of The Church of Jesus Christ of Latter-day Saints
 List of temples of The Church of Jesus Christ of Latter-day Saints by geographic region
 Temple architecture (Latter-day Saints)
 The Church of Jesus Christ of Latter-day Saints in Paraguay

References

External links
 
 Official Asunción Paraguay Temple page
 Asunción Paraguay Temple at ChurchofJesusChristTemples.org

21st-century Latter Day Saint temples
Buildings and structures in Asunción
Temples (LDS Church) completed in 2002
Temples (LDS Church) in Latin America
Temples (LDS Church) in South America
The Church of Jesus Christ of Latter-day Saints in Paraguay
2002 establishments in Paraguay